Jeremy Marcus Illingworth (born 20 May 1977) is an English former professional footballer who played as a midfielder in the Football League for Huddersfield Town. He began his career as a trainee with his home-town club, then, after trials at clubs including Cambridge United, went on to forge a lengthy career in non-league football with Wisbech Town, Ashton United, where he scored 29 goals from 103 games in all competitions, Altrincham (1 from 15), Stocksbridge Park Steels (17 from 91), Guiseley, Bradford Park Avenue and A.F.C. Emley.

References

External links
 

1977 births
Living people
Footballers from Huddersfield
English footballers
Association football forwards
Huddersfield Town A.F.C. players
Wisbech Town F.C. players
Ashton United F.C. players
Altrincham F.C. players
Stocksbridge Park Steels F.C. players
Guiseley A.F.C. players
Bradford (Park Avenue) A.F.C. players
Emley A.F.C. players
English Football League players
Association football midfielders